Rashid Abdullah Al Nuaimi راشد عبدالله النعيمي is the former foreign minister of the United Arab Emirates.

Early life and education
Nuaimi is a member of the ruling family of Ajman, Al Nuaimi. He holds a bachelor's degree in petroleum engineering, which he received from the University of Cairo in 1967.

Career
Nuaimi started his career at the department of oil and industrial affairs in the Emirate of Abu Dhabi. Then he joined the Emirati ministry of foreign affairs and until 1975, he worked there in various capacities. In 1975, he was named as the director of political affairs department at the foreign ministry. In 1976, he became undersecretary for foreign affairs. He served as the minister of state for foreign affairs from 1977 to 1990. Hamdan bin Zayed succeeded him in the post.

References

Year of birth missing (living people)
Living people
Cairo University alumni
Foreign ministers of the United Arab Emirates
Emirati diplomats
Emirati politicians
Government ministers of the United Arab Emirates
Emirati engineers
Recipients of orders, decorations, and medals of Sudan